Justice Fisher may refer to:

George P. Fisher (1817–1899), associate justice of the Supreme Court of the District of Columbia	
Stanley Fisher (1867–1949), 24th Chief Justice of Ceylon

See also
Patrick F. Fischer (born 1957), justice of the Ohio Supreme Court	
Judge Fischer (disambiguation)
Judge Fisher (disambiguation)